Nicrophorus validus is a burying beetle described by Portevin in 1920 and distributed in the Himalayas, Nepal, and Tibet.

References

Silphidae
Beetles of North America
Beetles described in 1920